Léopold Bévière (4 February 1864 – 6 September 1935) was a French architect. His work was part of the architecture event in the art competition at the 1928 Summer Olympics.

References

1864 births
1935 deaths
20th-century French architects
Olympic competitors in art competitions
People from Fourmies, Nord